The ARM Cortex-A7 MPCore is a 32-bit microprocessor core licensed by ARM Holdings implementing the ARMv7-A architecture announced in 2011.

Overview

It has two target applications; firstly as a smaller, simpler, and more power-efficient successor to the Cortex-A8. The other use is in the big.LITTLE architecture, combining one or more A7 cores with one or more Cortex-A15 cores into a heterogeneous system. To do this it is fully feature-compatible with the A15.

Key features of the Cortex-A7 core are:
 Partial dual-issue, in-order microarchitecture with an 8-stage pipeline
 NEON SIMD instruction set extension
 VFPv4 Floating Point Unit
 Thumb-2 instruction set encoding
 Jazelle RCT
 Hardware virtualization
 Large Page Address Extensions (LPAE)
 Integrated level 2 Cache (0–1 MB)
 1.9 DMIPS / MHz
 Typical clock speed 1.5 GHz

Chips
Several system-on-chips (SoC) have implemented the Cortex-A7 core, including:
 Allwinner A20 (dual-core A7 + Mali-400 MP2 GPU)
 Allwinner A31 (quad-core A7 + PowerVR SGX544MP2  GPU)
 Allwinner A83T (octa-core A7 + PowerVR SGX544  GPU)
 Allwinner H3(quad-core A7 + Mali-400 MP2 GPU)
 Broadcom BCM23550 quad-core HSPA+ Multimedia Processor
 Broadcom BCM2836 (quad-core A7 + VideoCore IV GPU), designed specifically for Raspberry Pi 2
 NXP Semiconductor (Formerly Freescale) QorIQ Layerscape LS1 (dual-core A7)
 Freescale i.MX 6 UltraLite
 HiSilicon K3V3, big.LITTLE architecture with dual-core Cortex-A7 and dual-core Cortex-A15. Use ARM Mali-T658 GPU.
 Marvell PXA1088 (quad-core A7 + Vivante GC1000)
Mediatek MT6570 (dual-core A7 + ARM Mali-400MP1 GPU)
 Mediatek MT6572 (dual-core A7 + ARM Mali-400MP1 GPU)
Mediatek MT6580 (quad-core A7 + ARM Mali-400MP2 GPU)
Mediatek MT6582 (quad-core A7 + ARM Mali-400MP2 GPU)
 Mediatek MT6589 (quad-core A7 + Imagination Technologies PowerVR SGX544 GPU)
 Mediatek MT6592 (octa-core A7 + ARM Mali-450MP4 GPU)
  Mstar MSB2531A  ARM Cortex A7 32bit 800MHZ
 Qualcomm Snapdragon 200 and Snapdragon 400 MSM8212 and MSM8612, MSM8226, MSM8626 and MSM8926 (quad core A7 + Adreno 305 GPU)
 Samsung Exynos 5 Octa (5410), big.LITTLE architecture with quad-core Cortex-A7 and quad-core Cortex-A15. Use Imagination Technologies PowerVR SGX544MP3 GPU.
 Samsung Exynos 5 Octa (5420), big.LITTLE architecture with quad-core Cortex-A7 and quad-core Cortex-A15. Use ARM Mali-T628MP6 GPU.
 STMicroelectronics STM32MP1 (dual-core A7 + M4 + Vivante GPU)

See also

 ARM architecture
 Comparison of ARMv7-A cores
 JTAG
 List of applications of ARM cores
 List of ARM cores

References

External links

ARM Holdings
 
 Cortex-A7 Technical Reference Manuals
Other
 Cortex-A7 instruction cycle timings

ARM processors
ARM Holdings IP cores